John Otto Roeser (August 31, 1923 – June 13, 2014) was an American engineer, inventor, entrepreneur, businessman, civic leader and candidate for elected office.

Roeser was born in Chicago, the youngest son of Irene and Otto Roeser. As a boy he designed and built free flight model aircraft winning national championships.

Roeser was the chairman and founder of Otto Engineering Inc. in Carpentersville, Illinois, which manufactures electronic control and communication switches for aerospace, medical and industrial uses since 1961. In 2006, Otto had over 500 employees and annual sales of over $79 million. He had received over 50 patents in electrical, mechanical, machinery and marine products.

Roeser enlisted in the Army in 1942 and served during World War II as a corporal in the 1689th Engineer Battalion Combat Engineers in the Pacific Theater.  He served in combat with distinction fighting the Japanese in the Philippines, most notably in the Battle of Leyte. He was one of the first U.S. soldiers to set foot on Japan after its surrender to the Allies in 1945.

In 1948, he received his Bachelor of Science in mechanical engineering from the University of Illinois graduating with Pi Tau Sigma honors. In 1996, Roeser was chosen as an Outstanding Alumnus of the University of Illinois.

After graduating from the University of Illinois and before founding Otto Engineering he worked at the Hawthorne Works and started a three other successful businesses which are now owned by other corporations.

Roeser was a competitive sailor. Of the many trophies his boat The Jeannine had won, the most prestigious is the Chicago-Mackinac Cup awarded in 1988 for winning the 90th running of the Chicago Yacht Club Race to Mackinac. Roeser lived in Barrington, Illinois, with his wife, Jeannine.

Civic and political activities
Roeser was the founder and president of the Family Taxpayers Foundation, a 501(c)(3) non-profit organization. The foundation claims as its primary focus the promotion of school choice as a catalyst for improvement in the public school system and as a vehicle for choices in education that will benefit students and empower parents.

Another core tenet of Roeser's political activism was the idea that teachers' unions are inherently corrupt. As Roeser himself stated, "As I’ve stated many times, the teachers union bosses have been a driving force behind making Illinois the most broke state and the most corrupt state, ruining Illinois’ finances and making our state among the worst run in the nation. They are part of the money collecting machine that controls Illinois."

Roeser was the publisher of Champion News, an internet news service which also had a Chicago talk radio program broadcast on WIND (AM) 560 AM.

Roeser challenged the incumbent Governor Jim Edgar in the Republican primary in 1994 and lost the election, receiving only 25% of the vote. He also served by appointment on Governor Edgar's Education Transition Team and Lamar Alexander's Education 2000 in Illinois.

As a conservative activist, Roeser "helped develop the Tea Party movement in Illinois" and was active in the movement. He "was a generous donor to local and national GOP candidates".

However, Roeser's status as a Republican standardbearer was not always appreciated. Bob Kjellander, treasurer of the Republican National Committee, referred to Roeser as "rule-or-ruin Republican" who frequently has abandoned his own party when someone he backs in a primary loses. During his ill-fated run for Governor of Illinois in 1994, many Republican insiders were dismissive of Roeser's appeal, even among Republicans, especially more moderate Republicans.

As noted by the Chicago Tribune in his obituary, while Roeser never disavowed any comments he had made, his own rhetoric also helped to cast him as an outsider — except to those candidates who wanted his campaign cash. Most candidates he backed in major politics went down in defeat — including his own ill-fated bid against Gov. Jim Edgar in 1994.

Views

Roeser did not believe that homosexuals were deserving of what he considered extraordinary rights in society: "The businessman in me must say that the whole concept of someone basing their identity on how they do sex, is repulsive. Adding the concept of 'gay pride' to it is beyond rationality; that the schools and media try to tell us that the homosexual lifestyle is OK, is nuts. No one looks at their baby boy and says, 'How wonderful, he can grow up to be a homosexual.' That destructive path leads to diseases and a short life for the homosexual, and no grandchildren for the parents of a misguided sexual extrovert."

In 2006, Roeser penned an op-ed piece on the Champion.net website decrying legal protections for homosexuals, "Is Gay Okay?" In the opinion piece he argued for the repeal of HB 3186, legislation that placed homosexuals in a "protected class" in regards to discrimination: "Notice that I haven’t objected to 'gay,' or some of its more depraved variations, on moral grounds, but many people do. Morality is usually based on religion or on long established opinion of what works or doesn’t. These moral opinions deserve respect. Why should the moralist or religious person be forced to accept a behavior long abhorred? HB 3186 should be repealed."

Awards
Business
High Tech Entrepreneur of the Year, 1991
Military Service
Bronze De Fleury Medal, May 13, 2008
Education
Elgin Community College Friend of Education Award
"Miracle on 41st Street" Award by St. Elizabeth School

Controversy
In 2004, a Federal Election Commission complaint by a Washington, DC, based group, Citizens for Responsibility and Ethics in Washington, alleged that Roeser illegally funded a series of attack advertisements against Barack Obama who was running for the U.S. Senate against Alan Keyes. Roeser, who pledged to raise $1 million for Keyes' campaign, contributed $40,000 to Empower Illinois and a related group and also met with Keyes to discuss his campaign. According to a settlement issued by the FEC, the Empower Illinois Media Fund violated campaign rules by raising money to defeat Obama without registering with the FEC as a political committee or complying with federal contribution limits and reporting requirements. Empower Illinois agreed to pay a $3,000 penalty and retroactively report its expenses and contributors. But the FEC could not prove Roeser was complicit in the groups' violations.

In December 2009, a radio advertisement attacking the Senate candidate U.S. Rep. Mark Kirk, Kirk's Republican primary opponent Andy Martin quoted Roeser as saying there is a "solid rumor that Kirk is a homosexual", and  "de facto pedophile". In response to the rumor-mongering advertisement, the Illinois Republican Party stated. "Mr. Martin will no longer be recognized as a legitimate Republican candidate by the Illinois Republican Party."

Otto Engineering
Roeser's company, Otto Engineering, manufactures military qualified switches and other products It has over 450 employees and has been awarded 278 government defense contracts. From 2000 to 2013, these contracts have netted Otto Engineering $5,142,512.

References

External links
Otto Engineering website

Family Taxpayers Foundation website
Champion News, an internet news site published by Jack Roeser
Champion News Talk Radio archives
Governmentcontractswon.com

1923 births
2014 deaths
Illinois Republicans
United States Army personnel of World War II
United States Army soldiers
University of Illinois alumni
20th-century American inventors
Engineers from Illinois
American businesspeople
Tea Party movement activists
People from Barrington, Illinois